Henricus Antonius Giovanni "Henk" Braakhuis (born 1939) is a Dutch historian of philosophy. He was a professor of history of medieval philosophy at the Radboud University Nijmegen.

His 1979 dissertation was titled: "Syncategoremata". Braakhuis was elected a member of the Royal Netherlands Academy of Arts and Sciences in 1990. In 2002 Braakhuis became interim director of the Constantijn Huygens Institute.

References

1939 births
Living people
Dutch historians of philosophy
Members of the Royal Netherlands Academy of Arts and Sciences
Academic staff of Radboud University Nijmegen